Zimny is a surname which means "cold" in Polish. Notable people with the surname include:

 Aleksandra Zimny (born 1996), Polish handball player
 Arthur L. Zimny (1900–1973), American politician
 Bob Zimny (1921–2011), American football player
 Kazimierz Zimny (born 1935), Polish athlete
 Simon Zimny (1927–2007), French footballer
 Tymoteusz Zimny (born 1998), Polish sprinter

See also
 

Polish-language surnames